James Oliver Eastland  (November 28, 1904 February 19, 1986) was an American attorney, plantation owner, and politician from Mississippi. A Democrat, he served in the United States Senate in 1941 and again from 1943 until his resignation on December 27, 1978. Eastland was a leader of Southern resistance against racial integration during the civil rights movement, often speaking of African Americans as "an inferior race." Eastland has been called the "Voice of the White South" and the "Godfather of Mississippi Politics."

The son of prominent attorney, politician, and cotton planter Woods Eastland, he attended the local schools of Scott County, Mississippi, and took courses at the University of Mississippi, Vanderbilt University, and the University of Alabama. He completed his legal education by studying in his father's office, attaining admission to the bar in 1927. Eastland practiced law in Sunflower County, Mississippi, and took over management of his family's cotton plantation. Becoming active in politics as a Democrat, he served in the Mississippi House of Representatives from 1928 to 1932.

When Senator Pat Harrison died in office in 1941, the governor appointed Eastland to fill the vacancy on the condition that Eastland not run in that year's special election to complete the term. Eastland served from June to September 1941. The special election was won by Wall Doxey. Eastland went on to defeat Doxey in the 1942 primary for the Democratic nomination for a full term. The Democratic party, which was then Mississippi's dominant party, made Eastland's primary victory a safe seat, and he returned to the Senate in January 1943. Eastland was reelected five times, serving until resigning in December 1978, days before the end of his final term. Eastland advanced through seniority to the chairmanship of the Senate Judiciary Committee, serving over 20 years, and President pro tempore of the Senate.

Early life
Eastland was born in Doddsville, in the Mississippi Delta on November 28, 1904, the son of Woods Caperton Eastland, a lawyer and cotton planter, and Alma Teresa (Austin) Eastland. He was named James after his late uncle, who was allegedly murdered earlier in 1904 by Luther Holbert, who was subsequently lynched. In 1905 he moved with his parents to Forest, the county seat of Scott County, Mississippi. His father was active in Mississippi politics and served as a district attorney. The son attended the local segregated public schools and graduated from Forest High School in 1922.

Eastland attended the University of Mississippi (1922-1924), Vanderbilt University (1925-1926), and the University of Alabama (1926-1927). He studied law in his father's office, attained admission to the bar in 1927, and practiced in Sunflower County. Active in politics, he was elected to one term in the Mississippi House of Representatives, and served from 1928 to 1932.  After completing his House term, Eastland remained active in politics and government.  He was a sought-after campaign speaker, including speeches on behalf of the gubernatorial candidacies of Paul B. Johnson Sr. in 1935 and 1939.  In addition, he was a member of the board of trustees of the state hospital for the insane.

Even after entering politics, he considered himself first and foremost a cotton planter. Cotton plantations were adopting mechanization but he still had many African-American laborers on the plantation, most of whom worked as sharecroppers.

Senate career
Eastland was appointed to the U.S. Senate in 1941 by Governor Paul B. Johnson Sr., following the death of Senator Pat Harrison.  Johnson first offered the appointment to Woods Eastland, whom he had known since childhood; Woods Eastland declined and suggested his son. Johnson appointed James Eastland on the condition that he would not run later that year in the special election to complete the term, ensuring that no candidate would have the advantage of incumbency. Eastland kept his word, and the election was won by 2nd District Congressman Wall Doxey.

In 1942, Eastland was one of three candidates who challenged Doxey for a full term. Doxey had the support of President Franklin D. Roosevelt and Mississippi's senior U.S. Senator, Theodore G. Bilbo, but Eastland defeated him in the Democratic primary. At the time, Mississippi was effectively a one-party state, dominated by white Democrats since the disfranchisement of African Americans with the passage of the 1890 state constitution. The state used poll taxes, literacy tests and white primaries to exclude African Americans from the political system.

Eastland returned to the Senate on January 3, 1943. Roosevelt and Eastland developed a working relationship that enabled Eastland to oppose New Deal programs that were unpopular in Mississippi, while he supported the President's agenda on other issues. Eastland was effective in developing that type of arrangement with presidents of both parties during his long tenure in the Senate. Also effective because of his seniority, he gained major federal investment in the state, such as infrastructure construction including the Tennessee–Tombigbee Waterway and federal relief after disasters such as Hurricane Camille.

Early 1947 saw a renewed effort by the Truman administration to promote civil rights with activities such as President Truman addressing the National Association for the Advancement of Colored People (NAACP) and delivering an address to Congress entirely dedicated to the subject. Eastland, among many other Southerners who saw the civil rights backing of the administration as an attack on their "way of life", addressed the Senate floor a week after Truman's speech on the matter, saying Southerners were expected to "remain docile" in light of their laws and culture being destroyed "under the false guise of another civil-rights bill." Six weeks before the 1948 United States Presidential election, Eastland predicted the defeat of the incumbent President Harry Truman, telling an audience in Memphis, Tennessee that voting for him was a waste. After Truman's surprise victory, Eastland "remained publicly undaunted".

In 1956, Eastland was appointed chairman of the Senate Judiciary Committee, and he served in this position until his retirement from the Senate. He was re-elected five times. He did not face substantive Republican opposition until 1966, as party politics were realigning after passage of the Civil Rights Act of 1964 and the Voting Rights Act of 1965. In 1966, freshman Representative Prentiss Walker, the first Republican to represent Mississippi at the federal level since Reconstruction, ran against Eastland. The Walker campaign was an early Republican effort to attract white conservatives to its ranks, because recently passed civil rights legislation had enabled African Americans in the South to begin participating in the political process, and most of them became active as liberals in the Democratic Party.

Former Republican Party state chairman Wirt Yerger had considered running against Eastland but bowed out after Walker announced his candidacy. Walker ran well to Eastland's right, accusing him of not having done enough to keep integration-friendly judges from being confirmed by the Senate. As is often the case when a one-term representative runs against a popular incumbent senator or governor, Walker was soundly defeated. Years later, Yerger said that Walker's decision to relinquish his House seat after one term for the vagaries of a Senate race against Eastland was "very devastating" to the growth of the Mississippi Republicans.

In February 1960, Senator Kenneth B. Keating made a motion to report an Eisenhower administration-backed civil rights bill out of the Senate Judiciary Committee.  Olin D. Johnston objected on the grounds that the committee did not have permission to sit while the full Senate was meeting. Eastland upheld the objection. Keating later stated that Eastland intentionally refused to recognize him earlier, which prevented him from making his motion before the full Senate convened.  Eastland disputed Keating's claim, stated that he had recognized Keating in an appropriate manner, and advised Keating not to repeat his claim to the full Senate.

In September 1960, Eastland and Thomas Dodd said officials in the State Department cleared the way for the regime of Fidel Castro to reign in Cuba and that lower-ranking officials had misinformed Americans about the political climate of Cuba with assistance from the media. Incumbent Secretary of State Christian Herter responded to the claims by saying they were incorrect or misleading.

Eastland announced his support for United States Deputy Attorney General Byron White to replace the retiring Charles Evans Whittaker as Associate Justice on March 30, 1962, Eastland stating that White would be an able justice. White took office the following month.

Eastland introduced an amendment that he stated would nullify the Supreme Court prayer decision on June 29, 1962.

In September 1963, Eastland, Stennis, and Georgia Senator Richard Russell jointly announced their opposition to the ratification of the nuclear test ban treaty. The opposition was viewed as denting hopes of the Kennedy administration to be met with minimal disagreement during the treaty's appearance before the Senate.

In 1972, Eastland was reelected with 58 percent of the vote in his closest contest ever. His Republican opponent, Gil Carmichael, an automobile dealer from Meridian, was likely aided by President Richard Nixon's landslide reelection in 49 states, including taking 78 percent of Mississippi's popular vote. However, Nixon had worked "under the table" to support Eastland, a long-time personal friend. Nixon and other Republicans provided little support for Carmichael to avoid alienating conservative Southern Democrats, who increasingly supported Republican positions on many national issues.

The Republicans worked to elect two House candidates, Trent Lott and Thad Cochran, both of whom later became influential U.S. Senators. Recognizing that Nixon would handily carry Mississippi, Eastland did not endorse the Democratic presidential candidate, George McGovern of South Dakota, who was considered a liberal. Four years later, Eastland supported the candidacy of fellow Southern Democrat Jimmy Carter of Georgia, rather than Nixon's successor, President Gerald R. Ford.  Eastland's former press secretary, Larry Speakes, a Mississippi native, served as a press spokesman for Gerald Ford and Ford's running mate, US Senator Robert J. Dole.

In January 1970, after G. Harrold Carswell was accused of harboring both sexist and racist beliefs, Eastland told reporters that he believed this was the first instance of a Supreme Court nominee being challenged on his views on the legal rights of women. In April, the Senate Judiciary Committee scheduled a vote for a plan that if enacted would give each state one electoral vote for each congressional district. During a meeting with reporters, Eastland espoused his view that the Senate would not approve any constitutional amendment reforming the Presidential election system that year. In November, along with fellow Southerners Strom Thurmond and Sam J. Ervin Jr., Eastland was one of three Senators to vote against an occupational safety bill that would establish federal supervision to oversee working conditions. Later that month, after President Nixon vetoed a curb on spending for political broadcasts, Republican leader Hugh Scott announced that he would offer comprehensive campaign reforms the following year and called for senators to join him in sustaining the veto. It was agreed by members of both parties that Eastland was one of eight senators who were essential to supporting Democratic opposition to the veto and thereby make the difference in overriding it.

In April 1971, Eastland introduced a six‐bill package intended to adjust the Internal Security Act of 1950 in addition to plugging loopholes noted by various decisions made by the Supreme Court, Eastland noting that his proposed version of the Internal Security Act would give the Subversive Activities Control Board more efficiency.

In October 1971, after President Richard Nixon nominated Lewis F. Powell and William Rehnquist to the Supreme Court, Eastland announced his intent to hasten the hearings of Rehnquist and Powell while admitting his doubts that hearings would begin the following week given the Senate being in recess.

In October 1974, Eastland was one of five senators to sponsor legislation authored by Jesse Helms permitting prayer in public schools and taking the issue away from the Supreme Court which had previously ruled in 1963 that school prayer violated the First Amendment to the United States Constitution through the establishment of a religion.

In June 1976, Eastland joined a coalition of Democratic politicians who endorsed Georgia Governor Jimmy Carter for the presidency. The New York Times assessed Stennis and Eastland as jointly "trying to pull Mississippi out for Mr. Carter" in their first campaign for a national Democrat in decades.

On May 18, 1977, Eastland made a joint appearance with President Jimmy Carter in the Rose Garden in support of proposed foreign intelligence surveillance legislation. Eastland said the legislation was "vitally needed in this country" and that he was satisfied with its bipartisan support.

Over the summer of 1977, the Justice Department enlisted the aid of Eastland as part of its effort to thwart "balkanization" of litigation authority, Eastland and Attorney General Griffin Bell moving to block six measures that if enacted would have permitted the independent agencies to go to court under certain circumstances in the event the Justice Department did not act on a case 45 days after it was referred to the department.

By August 1977, the Carter administration reached a compromise plan to stem the flow of illegal aliens into the United States, Eastland, Attorney General Bell, and United States Secretary of Labor F. Ray Marshall agreeing to civil penalties up to $1,000 for offending employers.

By September 1977, the seventy-three-year-old Eastland was considering retirement, with discussions of Ted Kennedy assuming his position as Chairman of the Senate Judiciary Committee.

In October 1977, Eastland was one of several influential Senators invited to meet with President Carter as the latter tried gaining support in the Senate for the Panama Canal treaties.

Nixon resignation 
On February 14, 1974, Special Prosecutor for the U.S. Department of Justice Leon Jaworski wrote to Eastland complaining that President Nixon had refused to give him material that he needed for his Watergate investigation including 27 tapes relating to the Watergate cover‐up in addition to political donations of milk producers and the activities of the plumbers unit of the White House. The contents of the letter to Eastland were disclosed to the public by Jaworski the following month. In May, the House Judiciary Committee opened impeachment hearings against President Nixon after the release of 1,200 pages of transcripts of White House conversations between him and his aides and the administration. That month, the Senate Judiciary Committee passed a resolution supporting Jaworski observing that he was "acting within the scope of the authority conferred upon MT". Eastland's support for the resolution was seen by observers as part of a pattern of Nixon backers turning against him in light of the Watergate scandal. In August, Newsweek magazine released Eastland's name as one of thirty-six senators who the White House believed would support President Nixon remaining in office in the event of impeachment. The article mentioned the White House believing some of the supporters were shaky and that thirty-four of them would need to remain firm to override a potential conviction. Within days of the article's release, President Nixon announced his resignation in the face of near-certain impeachment.

Senate President pro tempore
During his last Senate term, Eastland was the longest-serving member of the majority party and was elected President pro tempore. Eastland is the most recent President pro tempore to have served during a vacancy in the Vice Presidency. He did so twice during the tumultuous 1970s, first from October to December 1973, following Spiro Agnew's resignation until the swearing-in of Gerald Ford as Vice President, and then from August to December 1974, from the time that Ford became President until Nelson Rockefeller was sworn in as Vice President. Then, Eastland was second in the presidential line of succession, behind only Speaker of the House Carl Albert.

Political positions

Opposition to civil rights
Eastland opposed integration and the civil rights movement.

During World War II, Eastland vocally opposed and denigrated the service of African American soldiers in the war. He incited protests and comparisons to Hitlerism following a vitriolic speech on the floor of the Senate in July 1945, in which he complained that the Negro soldier was physically, morally, and mentally incapable of serving in combat. Eastland claimed that the "boys from the South were fighting to maintain white supremacy".

In 1944 Eastland said: I have no prejudice in my heart, but the white race is the superior race and the Negro race an inferior race and the races must be kept separate by law.The same year he protested against Smith v. Allwright, which banned white primaries:As a member of the Senate Judiciary Committee, Eastland would alongside fellow southerners Olin D. Johnston of South Carolina and Harley M. Kilgore of West Virginia be one of three senators to report negatively on Earl Warren when President Eisenhower nominated him to the Supreme Court. He later was one of eleven senators to vote against John Marshall Harlan II and one of seventeen to vote against Potter Stewart.

When the Supreme Court issued its decision in the landmark case Brown v. Board of Education, ruling that segregation in public schools was unconstitutional, Eastland, like the majority of Southern Democrats, denounced it. In a speech given in Senatobia, Mississippi on August 12, 1955, he announced:

Eastland would become actively involved with the White Citizens' Council, an organization which boasted 60,000 members across the South and was called "the new Klan that enforces thought control by economic pressures."

Eastland testified to the Senate ten days after the Brown decision:

On July 24, 1957, interviewed by Mike Wallace on the occasion of the passing of the Civil Rights Act of 1957, Eastland said segregation was wanted by both races:As I said, we have more Nigra professional men, more businessmen, we have substantial Nigra cotton planters. In fact, they have made more progress in the South than in the North. The master-servant relationship today is largely a Northern product.In the Sixties, Eastland belonged to the Genetics Committee of the Pioneer Fund.

Civil rights workers Mickey Schwerner, James Chaney, and Andrew Goodman went missing in Mississippi on June 21, 1964, during the Freedom Summer efforts to register African American voters. Eastland tried to convince President Lyndon Johnson that the incident was a hoax and there was no Ku Klux Klan in the state. He suggested that the three had gone to Chicago:

Johnson once said:

Eastland, like most of his Southern colleagues, opposed the Civil Rights Act of 1964, which prohibited segregation of public places and facilities. Its passage caused many Mississippi Democrats to support Barry Goldwater's presidential bid that year, but Eastland did not publicly oppose the election of Johnson. Four years earlier he had quietly supported John F. Kennedy's presidential campaign, but Mississippi voted that year for unpledged electors. Although Republican Senator Goldwater was strongly defeated by incumbent Johnson, he carried Mississippi with 87.14 percent of the popular vote, which constitutes the best-ever Republican showing in any state since the founding of that party. In 1964, almost all blacks in Mississippi remained excluded from voting, thus Goldwater's mammoth win essentially constituted the vote of the white population.

Eastland was often at odds with Johnson's policy on civil rights, but they retained a close friendship based on long years together in the Senate. Johnson often sought Eastland's support and guidance on other issues, such as the nomination of Abe Fortas in 1968 as Chief Justice of the United States. The Solid South opposed him. In the 1950s, Johnson was one of three Senators from the South who did not sign the Southern Manifesto of resistance to Brown v. Board of Education, but Eastland and most Southern Senators did, vowing resistance to school integration.

Eastland lobbied for the appointment of his friend Harold Cox to a federal judgeship, promising John F. Kennedy, who planned to appoint Thurgood Marshall to the United States Court of Appeals, that he would permit Marshall's confirmation to go forward if Cox was also appointed to the bench. This was in keeping with Kennedy's approach to handling Eastland; not wanting to upset the powerful chairman of the Judiciary Committee, Kennedy generally acceded to Eastland's requests on judicial appointments in Mississippi, which resulted in white segregationists dominating the state's federal courts. Though Eastland agreed to allow Marshall's nomination to proceed, he and senators Robert Byrd, John McClellan, Olin D. Johnston, Sam Ervin, and Strom Thurmond, made unsuccessful attempts to block Marshall's confirmation to the Second Circuit Court of Appeals and the U.S. Supreme Court.

In early 1969, Eastland went to Rhodesia and came back praising the White minority regime for the "racial harmony" supposedly lacking from America. According to Ken Flower, head of the Rhodesian Central Intelligence Operation, Eastland once complained about the fact an hostel of Salisbury was integrated, stating "You've inserted the thin end of the wedge by allowing stinking niggers into such a fine hotel".

When he considered running for reelection in 1978, Eastland sought black support from Aaron Henry, civil rights leader and president of the National Association for the Advancement of Colored People. Henry told Eastland that it would be difficult for him to earn the support of black voters given his "master-servant philosophy with regard to blacks." Eastland decided not to seek re-election. Partly because of the independent candidacy of Charles Evers siphoning off votes from the Democratic nominee, Maurice Dantin, Republican 4th District Representative Thad Cochran won the race to succeed Eastland. Eastland resigned the day after Christmas, enabling the governor to appoint Cochran to complete the last few days of Eastland's term, which gave Cochran a seniority advantage over other senators elected in 1978. After his retirement, Eastland remained friends with Aaron Henry and sent contributions to the NAACP, but he said that he "didn't regret a thing" in his public career.

Anti-Semitism 
In 1968, after opposing the nomination of Abe Fortas to Chief Justice, Eastland, as chair of the Judiciary committee, said "After [Thurgood] Marshall, I could not go back to Mississippi if a Jewish chief justice swore in the next president."

In 1977, Eastland "sneer(ed) openly at Senator Jacob Javits, saying, 'I don't like you or your kind,' because Javits was Jewish."

Anticommunism
Eastland served on a subcommittee in the 1950s investigating the Communist Party in the United States. As chairman of the Internal Security Subcommittee, he subpoenaed some employees of The New York Times to testify about their activities. The paper was taking a strong position on its editorial page that Mississippi should adhere to the Brown decision, and claimed that Eastland was persecuting them on that account.  The Times said in its January 5, 1956 editorial:

Eastland subsequently allowed the subcommittee to become dormant as communist fears receded.

Marijuana
In 1974, Eastland led congressional subcommittee hearings into marijuana, the report on which concluded:

Relationship with FBI

Eastland was a staunch supporter of FBI Director J. Edgar Hoover, and shared intelligence with the FBI, including leaks from the State Department. An investigation initiated by Attorney General Robert F. Kennedy and executed by former FBI agent Walter Sheridan traced some of the unauthorized disclosures to Otto Otepka of the State Department Office of Security.

Hoover received intelligence that Eastland was among members of Congress who had received money and favors from Rafael Trujillo, dictator of the Dominican Republic. Eastland had regularly defended him from the Senate floor. Hoover declined to pursue Eastland on corruption charges.

Later years
In his last years in the Senate, Eastland was recognized by most Senators as one who knew how to wield the legislative powers he had accumulated. Many Senators, including liberals who opposed many of his positions, acknowledged the fairness with which he chaired the Judiciary Committee, sharing staff and authority that chairmen of other committees jealously held for themselves. He maintained friendly personal ties with liberal Democrats such as Ted Kennedy, Walter Mondale, Joe Biden and Philip Hart, even though they disagreed on many issues. Following Johnson's retirement from the White House, Eastland frequently visited Johnson at his Texas ranch.

Eastland's closest friend and confidant was Leander Perez.

Eastland died on February 19, 1986.

While at a fundraiser on June 18, 2019, presidential candidate Biden said that one of his greatest strengths was "bringing people together" and pointed to his relationships with Eastland and fellow segregationist senator Herman Talmadge as examples. While imitating a Southern drawl, Biden remarked, "I was in a caucus with James O. Eastland. He never called me 'boy,' he always called me 'son.'” New Jersey Senator Cory Booker was one of many Democrats to criticize Biden for the remarks, issuing a statement that said, "You don't joke about calling black men 'boys.' Men like James O. Eastland used words like that, and the racist policies that accompanied them, to perpetuate white supremacy and strip black Americans of our very humanity".

Portrayal in popular culture

Eastland was portrayed by actor Jeff Doucette in the 2016 HBO film All the Way and by Nicholas Bell in the 2022 film Elvis.

References

Further reading
 Annis, Jr. J. Lee.  Big Jim Eastland: The Godfather of Mississippi (University Press of Mississippi, 2016)
 Asch, Chris Myers.  "Reconstruction Revisited: James O. Eastland, the Fair Employment Practices Committee, and the Reconstruction of Germany, 1945–1946", Journal of Mississippi History (Spring 2005)
 Finley, Keith M. Delaying the Dream: Southern Senators and the Fight Against Civil Rights, 1938–1965 (Baton Rouge, LSU Press, 2008).
 Robinson, Patricia Webb.  A Rhetorical Analysis of Senator James O. Eastland's Speeches, 1954–1959 .
 Menace of Subversive Activity by James Oliver Eastland. Publisher: Congressional Record (1966).

 "The South: The Authentic Voice", Time magazine, March 26, 1956; article about James Eastland
 Zwiers, Maarten.  Senator James Eastland: Mississippi's Jim Crow Democrat (Louisiana State University Press, 2015)

External links
 Transcript, James O. Eastland Oral History Interview I, February 19, 1971, by Joe B. Frantz, Internet Copy, LBJ Library. Accessed April 3, 2005.
 Finding-Aid for the James O. Eastland Collection (MUM00117) from the University of Mississippi Library. Accessed August 17, 2006.

 The James Oliver Eastland Collection owned by the University of Mississippi
 James Eastland  interviewed by Mike Wallace on The Mike Wallace Interview
 Oral History Interview with James Eastland, from the Lyndon Baines Johnson Library

1904 births
1986 deaths
20th-century American businesspeople
American planters
American segregationists
American white supremacists
Democratic Party members of the Mississippi House of Representatives
Mississippi lawyers
People from Sunflower County, Mississippi
Presidents pro tempore of the United States Senate
Democratic Party United States senators from Mississippi
University of Alabama alumni
University of Mississippi alumni
Vanderbilt University alumni
20th-century American politicians
People from Forest, Mississippi
20th-century American lawyers
History of racism in Mississippi
American anti-communists